CarMax, Inc. is a used vehicle retailer based in the United States. It operates two business segments: CarMax Sales Operations and CarMax Auto Finance.  The corporate entity behind the formation of CarMax was Circuit City Stores, Inc. The first CarMax retail location opened in September 1993 in Richmond, Virginia. As of October 2022, CarMax operates 238 locations.

While CarMax stores focus on marketing used vehicles, the company acquired its first new car franchise with Chrysler Corporation in 1996. By 1999, it added new vehicle franchises for Mitsubishi Motors, Toyota, and Nissan. In late 2021, CarMax sold its last new vehicle dealership, located in Kenosha, Wisconsin, to the Rydell Company.

About 
CarMax's headquarters is located in Richmond, Virginia. CarMax Auto Finance operates from Kennesaw, Georgia. There are CarMax retail locations in 41 states as well as customer service call-centers (called Customer Experience Centers).

Concept 
The concept for CarMax was developed by Circuit City executives under then-CEO Richard L. Sharp. It was developed for nearly a year in 1991, using the code name "Project X", and was also known as "Honest Rick's Used Cars" to those intimately involved in the skunk works team. The concept was actually first proposed by Ronald L. Moore of Richmond, Virginia, a consultant hired by Circuit City to evaluate possible business opportunities beyond the scope of their consumer electronics locations.

Prior to the first store being built, DeVito/Verdi was hired as the advertising agency and creative resource. The company executed the campaign and additional TV advertisements over the course of a number of years in support of the launch and the initial wave of stores.

The business model began with no fees, however the model was subsequently abandoned for the current business model after it was determined that customers were not concerned about paying transaction fees for the purchase of a vehicle.

On average, a CarMax location employs 40 sales associates. Each car goes through a thorough 125-point inspection process, beyond any state-required inspections, and includes a 90-day warranty, three days to change the financing for free, and a 30-day money back guarantee.

Circuit City issued the first CarMax stock in February 1997, when CarMax had seven locations. Initially, the stock was a tracking stock still under the umbrella of Circuit City. CarMax officially split from Circuit City as of October 1, 2002, when it was spun off as a stock dividend for Circuit City shareholders, with shares also issued to those holding CarMax tracking stock.

CarMax sold over 750,000 vehicles to consumers in Fiscal Year 2021 (March 1, 2020 - February 28, 2021).  According to the CarMax fiscal year 2018 report released on April 24, 2018, the company opened 15 used car superstores in Fiscal Year 2018, and expects to open 15 additional stores in Fiscal Year 2019.

Competition 
While CarMax is seen as the nation's largest used-car retailer, it is not without competition.  With a large shift in customer shopping habits, more online-only companies have worked to eat away are market share in the used vehicle market.  To combat this CarMax unveiled what it calls their Omni-channel platform, which is aimed at allowing customer to buy a car online, in-store, or any combination of the two. They also have provided opportunities for customers to choose vehicle delivery at their home, contactless curbside pickup, and more. These offerings directly compete with other home delivery based options such as Carvana, Vroom, Shift Technologies, and others.

Recognition 
CarMax is listed on Fortunes "100 Best Companies to Work For" list from 2005 to 2022, placing 98th in 2022. 

Other awards include:
Fortune Best Workplaces in Retail
Best Workplaces for Diversity 2019
Training Magazine's - Training Top 125

References

External links

CarMax Auction official website
CarMax Foundation official website

Circuit City
1993 establishments in Virginia
Companies based in Richmond, Virginia
American companies established in 1993
Retail companies established in 1993
Companies listed on the New York Stock Exchange
Auto dealerships of the United States
1997 initial public offerings
Corporate spin-offs
Used car market
Automotive websites
Online automotive companies of the United States